The Diyala Governorate election of 2013 was held on 20 April 2013 alongside elections for all other governorates outside Iraqi Kurdistan, Kirkuk, Anbar, and Nineveh.

Results 

|- style="background-color:#E9E9E9"
!align="left" colspan=2 valign=top|Party/Coalition!! Allied national parties !! Leader !!Seats !! Change !!Votes
|-
|
|align=left|Diyala's National Alliance || align=left|State of Law CoalitionCitizens AllianceLiberal Coalition || align=left|Nouri Al-MalikiAmmar al-HakimMoqtada al-Sadr || 12 || 7 || 170,292
|-
|bgcolor="#00009F"|
|align=left|Iraqi Diyala ||align=left|MuttahidoonArabian Al Iraqia || align=left|Usama al-NujayfiSaleh al-Mutlaq || 10 || 5 || 149,535
|-
|bgcolor="#CCFF33"|
|align=left|Brotherhood and Coexistence Alliance List || align=left|KDPPUK || || 3 || 4 || 49,415
|-
|bgcolor="#098DCD"|
|align=left|Al Iraqia National and United Coalition || || align=left|Ayad Allawi || 2 || 1 || 27,670
|-
|
|align=left|Determined to Build || align=left| || align=left|Mizhir Taha Hamad Mohamed || 1 || || 17,935
|-
|
|align=left|Diyala's New Coalition || align=left| || align=left|Saleh Birsim Khalil Ibrahim || 1 || || 13,980
|-
|
|align=left|Diyala's Loyal Sons' Bloc || align=left| || align=left|Suhad Ismael Abdul Rahim Saleh || || || 6,053
|-
|bgcolor="#F6BE22"|
|align=left|Iraq's Benevolence and Generosity List || || || || || 4,510
|-
|
|align=left|Diyala's Will Coalition || align=left| || align=left|Adnan Abdul Karim Abed Ali Omran || || || 3,846
|-
|
|align=left|Iraqi Commission of Independent Civil Society Organizations || align=left| || align=left| Bassel Abdul Wahab Mohammad Hussain || || || 3,546
|-
|
|align=left|New Generation Bloc || align=left| || align=left|Zuhair Nawruz Darwish Mahmud Hassan || || || 2,963
|-
|
|align=left|Arabs' Frontier || align=left| || align=left|Jawad Kathem Hamad Latif || || || 2,851
|-
|
|align=left|Hazem Mustafa Ismael Isa Al Biyati || align=left|Independent || || || || 2,393
|-
|
|align=left|Free Iraqi Coalition || align=left| || align=left|Zeid Abed Tayeh Abawi || || || 2,133
|-
|
|align=left|The Advocate's Party || align=left| || align=left|Saad Jasem Naser Hussein || || || 913
|-
|
|align=left|Law Advocate Knights' Bloc || || || || || 749
|-
|bgcolor="#6398FE"|
|align=left|National White Bloc || align=left| || align=left|Saad Abdullah Hamud Thamer || || || 527
|-
|colspan=2 align=left| Total || || || 29 || || 459,311 
|-
|colspan=7 align=left|Sources: al-Sumaria - Diyala Coalitions, ISW, IHEC

References 

2013 Iraqi governorate elections